Michael Rolfe Gira (born February 19, 1954) is an American singer-songwriter, multi-instrumentalist, author and artist.  He is the main force behind the New York City musical group Swans and fronted Angels of Light.  He is also the founder of Young God Records.

Biography

Early life
Michael Rolfe Gira was born February 19, 1954, in Los Angeles, California to Alice (née Shulte), originally from Iowa, and Robert Pierre Gira. His mother was an alcoholic, and Gira spent much of his early life caring for his younger brother. Gira has commented that his parents were "not around much" during his early childhood.

As an adolescent, Gira was arrested in California several times for petty crimes. Facing the risk of being incarcerated in a juvenile hall, he relocated with his father to Germany following a short stay in South Bend, Indiana. While in Germany, Gira ran away and hitchhiked across Europe, lived in Israel for a year, and spent four and a half months in an adult jail in Jerusalem for selling hashish. He turned 16 when in jail.

Returning to California around age seventeen, Gira worked at a bakery on Redondo Beach Pier, completed his GED, went to community college, and then attended Otis College of Art and Design in Los Angeles. He moved to New York in 1979, where he played in a band called Circus Mort, before forming the band Swans. In Manhattan, Gira found employment as a construction worker, doing demolition, sheetrock installation, and plastering.

Swans

Initially, Swans' focus was raw rhythm and abrasive textures, usually eschewing melody for visceral power, becoming known for their abrasive experimental and post-industrial sound. Their commercial success was limited, but Swans earned critical notice and had a devoted following.

The band's lineup and sound evolved over time, and their music became somewhat more conventional. A marked shift in Swans' music came with inclusion of Gira's partner, Jarboe, who added her ethereal voice and synthesizers to the group in 1985. Gira and Swans spent the next twelve years releasing studio, live, and side-project albums. Gira's frustration with various record labels grew over time, and he disbanded Swans in 1997. 

However, in 2010, Gira decided to revive the band, with members new and old. They released a new album titled My Father Will Guide Me Up a Rope to the Sky. A second post-revival album, The Seer, was released in 2012. A third, To Be Kind, was released in 2014.  All three were met with increasing critical acclaim. The Glowing Man followed and was released in June 2016. The band's latest album, Leaving Meaning, was released in 2019.

Solo career and Angels of Light

After dissolving Swans in 1997 Gira released a solo album under his own name and began a new musical direction with Angels of Light, which are a quieter, more acoustic-based group than Swans.

Gira also spent time experimenting with soundscapes, found sound, and loops with The Body Lovers / The Body Haters project. He has also released several albums under his own name including Drainland (1995), a spoken word album called The Somniloquist (2000), and What We Did (2001), a collaboration with Windsor for the Derby's frontman Dan Matz.

Gira founded his own record label, Young God Records, which has released albums from such artists as Devendra Banhart, Mi and L'au, and Akron/Family as well as Swans, The Angels of Light and The Body Lovers' back catalogues.

Akron/Family served as Gira's backing band during the recording of and touring for The Angels of Light's 2005 album, The Angels of Light Sing 'Other People'.

Gira has spoken of his decision to shift his focus from The Angels of Light back to Swans as a move based on impassivity. He has stated, "I had been doing this band Angels of Light for thirteen years, and had reached a kind of impassivity with that, sorta like I had reached an impassivity with Swans when I initially stopped it."

Writings
Gira's first short story collection The Consumer was published in 1995 by Henry Rollins's 2.13.61 publications. It is divided into two parts, the first being "The Consumer", a series of short stories from the early 1990s, the second, "Various Traps, Some Weaknesses", made up mostly of prose-poems and vignettes, all dating from 1983–1986. (Many of these earlier stories had previously been published by SST Records as Selfishness, with illustrations by Raymond Pettibon.) The stories contain many disturbing images and scenes including incest, identity loss, murder, self-hatred, rape, and both mental and physical decay.

In February 2018, Gira released his second short story collection, The Egg. Limited to 2,500 hand-signed copies, The Egg compiles seventeen stories written over 2016. Included with the release is a disc containing narrations of a handful of stories from The Egg as well as a few from The Consumer.

In May 2022, Gira released a collection of Swans lyrics, stories, and journals titled The Knot, in a collector's edition of 3,000 hand-numbered copies. The Knot is 408 pages long, and additionally contains 101 color images. The Knot contains all of the lyrics from the first Swans EP to Leaving Meaning, as well as lyrics from Angels of Light and World of Skin, among Gira's other projects, and includes archived writings from 1974 to 2022.

Equipment
Michael Gira is known for using a Guild antique burst electro acoustic guitar, and a Roland JC-120 Jazz Chorus Guitar Amplifier during his solo concerts. With Swans, Gira has used a variety of instruments including Ovation acoustic guitars and a Westbury Track II bass guitar during early performances. During the Soundtracks for the Blind and Swans are Dead era, Gira can be seen with a Gibson Lucille (which has since become his main guitar for the Swans reunion), a Fender Telecaster and a Gibson Les Paul. Recent shows have seen Gira using Orange amplifiers and cabinets, as well as Mesa Boogie cabinets.

Discography

Solo Albums
 Drainland (1995)
 Solo Recordings at Home (2001)
 I Am Singing To You from My Room (2004)
 I Am Not Insane (2010)
 The Egg: Stories by Michael Gira (2018)

Collaborations
 Hard Rock (1984) – with Lydia Lunch
 A Diamond Hidden in the Mouth of a Corpse (1985) – with various artists
 Offenbarung und Untergang by Georg Trakl (1999) - with Étant Donnés
 What We Did (2001) - With Dan Matz
 Gantse Mishpuchah Music in Three Parts (2004) - with David Coulter, Jean-Marie Mathoul & Charlemagne Palestine

Live Albums
 Jarboe Emergency Medical Fund (1999)
 The Somniloquist (2000)
 Living '02 (2002)

Compilations
 Songs for a Dog (1999)
 The Milk of M. Gira: Selected Solo Home Recordings 2001-2010 (2011)
 I Am Not This (2016)

With Swans
 Filth (1983)
 Cop (1984)
 Greed (1986)
 Holy Money (1986)
 Children of God (1987)
 The Burning World (1989)
 White Light from the Mouth of Infinity (1991)
 Love of Life (1992)
 The Great Annihilator (1995)
 Soundtracks for the Blind (1996)
 My Father Will Guide Me up a Rope to the Sky (2010)
 The Seer (2012)
 To Be Kind (2014)
 The Glowing Man (2016)
 Leaving Meaning (2019)

With Angels of Light
 New Mother (1999)
 How I Loved You (2001)
 Everything Is Good Here/Please Come Home (2003)
 The Angels of Light Sing 'Other People' (2005)
 Akron/Family & Angels of Light (2005) – with Akron/Family
 We Are Him (2007)

With World of Skin
 Shame, Humility, Revenge (1988)
 Ten Songs for Another World (1990)

References

Further reading

External links

Young God Records' website

1954 births
Living people
American male singers
Swans (band) members
Pigface members
American post-punk musicians
American rock guitarists
American experimental guitarists
American male guitarists
American industrial musicians
American male writers
Guitarists from Los Angeles
No wave musicians
Noise rock musicians
Otis College of Art and Design alumni
Prisoners and detainees of Israel
Psychedelic folk musicians
Singers from Los Angeles
Young God Records artists
Alternative Tentacles artists
20th-century American guitarists